Jen Lewin is an interactive artist and engineer with a studio based in New York City who specializes in large scale installations in public spaces, usually combining elements such as light, sound and complex engineering. Her interactive light installation The Pool debuted in 2008 and has been exhibited across the globe, in cities such as Singapore, Sydney, Denver, Montréal and Prague, and in events such as South By Southwest and Burning Man.

Lewin has written publications about CAD-related topics. Her work has appeared on National Geographic.

Life and career
Lewin grew up in Maui and obtained her BA in Architecture and Computer Aided Design from the University of Colorado Boulder, later obtaining her M.P.S. degree in Interactive Design from Tisch School of the Arts.

Lewin married Kimbal Musk in 2001, brother of Elon Musk. They had two children together. They divorced in 2010. Lewin married William (Bill) Magnuson in 2012, and currently lives with Bill and their two children in New York City. In 2015 Lewin purchased a 4-story condo in Manhattan for 7 million dollars.

Her most known work, The Pool, featured on Wired, consists of over 200 LED-lit platforms that change color according to pressure and speed changes elicited by viewers' interactions with the system. Termed an "interactive light sculpture", where human interaction is necessary for its display, this installation has toured several countries. Specializing in works that involve technology and human interaction, she often includes musical elements into her creations. For instance, other projects or hers include laser harps, where people elicit music via interrupting the laser arrangements.

According to the Boulder Weekly, Google commissioned Lewin to "create an Android app for tracking feedback between her innovations and the groups of people interacting with them". Lewin, along with her Pool installation, was featured by the BBC News in May 2013.

Jen Lewin was co-founder of The Kitchen restaurants in Boulder, along with Hugo Matheson and then husband, Kimbal Musk. She designed its three original locations. Lewin is also the original designer behind the Learning Gardens  created for Kimbal Musk and his foundation The Kitchen Community, now called Big Green.

Lewin also co-founded The Studio Boulder with business partner William Goodrich.

Works

Installations
2017 Burning Man and Descanso Gardens: Aqueous
2015 Be The Match Foundation, Minneapolis: Sidewalk Harp"
2015 The Magical Bridge Playground, Palo Alto: Magical Harp2017 University of Ohio Akron, Flux Chandelier
2017 Coral Springs Florida, Art Walk: Ascent by Jen Lewin 

2010 Solaris, Vail: The Water Tree by Lawrence Argent, Light Art by Jen Lewin

Exhibitions
2020
Takanawa Gateway Fest, Tokyo
Oklahoma Contemporary
Hong Kong Arts Centre
Redwood City: Magical Harp and Light Pools
Walnut Creek: Light Pool
MSP Signature Work (Minneapolis Saint Paul Terminal 1.)
Light Wall, Iolani School, Honolulu, Hawaii

2019
Aushans Harp, Aurora, Colorado
Euclid, Norwalk, CT, Brookfeild Place
Norwalk Cloud, Norwalk, CT, Brookfeild Plac

2018
Vivid Sydney
Jeju Pool, South Korea 
Promenade, Denver

2017
Georgetown Glow, Georgetown DC: Aqueous
Visual Arts Week, Mexico City: The Pool
Enchanted Forest of Light, Descanso Gardens, Los Angeles: Aqueous
BLINK Cincinnati: The Pool
Worlds Fair Nano, Brooklyn: Aqueous
Jing An Kerry Centre, Shanghai: The Pool
Burning Man Black Rock City Honoraria, Black Rock City: Aqueous
Light Festival Jerusalem: The Pool
Chattanooga: The Pool
Light City, Baltimore: Reflect
Hong Kong Arts Festival:Hong Kong

2016
Arrow Arts Challenge, Denver, Colorado
Cherry Creek Arts Festival, Denver, Colorado
Midtown Crossing at Turner Park, Omaha, Nebraska
WAVE: Light + Sound + Art, Breckenridge, Colorado
NYCxDESIGN at the Design Pavilion, New York City
B-Light Festival, Manama
Mother of the Nation Festival, Abu Dhabi
Light City, Baltimore
i Light Marina Bay, Singapore
SPECTRA, Aberdeen
Winter Lights at Canary Wharf, London

2015
Luna Fete, New Orleans
Istanbul Light Festival, Istanbul
igNIGHT, Fort McMurray
Burning Man
Cherry Creek Arts Festival at Stanley
Nur-Sultan, Kazakhstan
Bonnaroo Music Festival
Summer in Paradise, West Palm Beach, Florida
Montreal en Lumiere, Montreal, Quebec
Canal Convergence, Scottsdale, Arizona

2014
University of Warwick Arts Centre
Signal Festival, Prague
Art de Colombo, Lisbon
Burning Man, Honorarium Artist
AHA! Light Up Cleveland
Vivid Sydney
i Light Marina Bay, Singapore
Luminosity, Lexington

2013
Chalk The Block, El Paso
Conway Artsfest
Denver Art Biennale
Escape From Wonderland
Electric Daisy Carnival, Orlando, NYC, Chicago & Vegas
University of Colorado Boulder Art Museum, Boulder, Colorado: Its ElectricSouth by Southwest Republic Park

2012
La Napoule Art Foundation, Denver
Burning Man, Honorarium Project

 Awards 
2020 Black Rock City Honoraria: Cosmos
2017 CODAaward: Merit Award Public Spaces: Sidewalk Harp
2017 Burning Man Arts Black Rock City Honoraria Grant: Aqueous
2017 Pre-qualified Public Artist: San Francisco Arts Commission
2017 Pre-qualified Public Artist: Houston Arts Alliance
2016 CODAvideo Award: Experience: Sidewalk Harp
2016 CODAawards Top 100: Sidewalk Harp
2016 Pre-qualified Artist, San Antonio Arts Commission
2016 CODAvideo Award: Experience: Sidewalk Harp
2016 Prequalified Public Artist: Outdoor Public Art, City of Palo Alto
2015 Architizer A+, Popular Choice "Edison Cloud"
2014 Black Rock Arts Foundation Honorarium, Super Pool2014 Rotational Molding Product Design Competition: 1st Place Professional Division "Learning Gardens"
2013 University of Central Arkansas - Artist in Residence
2012 Black Rock Arts Foundation Honorarium, The Arc Harps2008 Burning Man artists grant: The Pool''
2005 Burning Man Honorarium: "Light Harp"
1996 Presidents Fund for Teaching Technology Research Grant
1996 Colorado Advanced Software Institute Research Grant

References

External links

Contemporary sculptors
Interactive art
American installation artists
Public art
Artists from Colorado
Tisch School of the Arts alumni
University of Colorado Boulder alumni
1974 births
Living people
21st-century American women artists
Women installation artists